Diary of a Prosecutor is a 2019 South Korean television series starring Lee Sun-kyun, Jung Ryeo-won, Lee Sung-jae, Kim Kwang-kyu, Lee Sang-hee and Jeon Sung-woo. Based on the essay of the same name by prosecutor Kim Woong, it aired on JTBC's Mondays and Tuesdays at 21:30 (KST) time slot from December 16, 2019, to February 11, 2020.<ref>{{cite web|last1=Jung|first1=An-ji|url=http://m.sportschosun.com/news.htm?id=201907260100202390013808&ServiceDate=20190725#_enliple|date=July 25, 2019|work=Sports Chosun|title=[공식]이선균X정려원, JTBC 검사내전' 캐스팅 확정…하반기 방송|language=ko|access-date=August 14, 2019}}</ref>

Synopsis
The stories of overworked prosecutors' daily lives in the fictional city of Jinyoung, South Korea.

Cast
Main
 Lee Sun-kyun as Lee Sun-woong
Narrator of the story, he is a passionate prosecutor of the Criminal Unit 2 who entered the prosecution ten years ago. He comes from a wealthy background and was acquainted with Myung-joo back in university, though the latter didn't like him being unaware of how privileged he was. Sun-woong is often in disagreement with Myung-joo soon after she becomes his colleague.
 Jung Ryeo-won as Cha Myung-joo
Formerly a successful prosecutor in Seoul, she has no choice but to move to Jinyoung and work at the District Prosecutors' Office until she can go back to the capital. She was Sun-woong's junior at university but she entered the prosecution one year earlier than him. She tends not to spend useless time on cases, she thus appears careless in the eyes of some of her colleagues.
 Lee Sung-jae as Jo Min-ho
Chief of Jinyoung District Prosecutor's Office's Criminal Unit 2, he has been a prosecutor for 18 years. He cannot bear that his team keeps coming second in the office. Following Myung-joo's incident in Seoul, he succeeds in convincing her of joining his unit and hopes that her arrival will raise his team's results.
 Kim Kwang-kyu as Hong Jong-hak
He has been a prosecutor for 14 years.
 Lee Sang-hee as Oh Yoon-jin
A working mother who has been a prosecutor for 4 years.
 Jeon Sung-woo as Kim Jung-woo
The youngest prosecutor of the Criminal Unit 2. Myung-joo becomes his mentor soon after settling in Jinyoung, replacing Sun-woong. He enjoys going on dates but his workload usually prevents him from doing so. He doesn't have a real passion for his job but decided to become a prosecutor because the profession is well seen by others.

Supporting
 Baek Hyun-joo as Jang Man-ok
An investigator with 30 years of experience, she usually works closely with Sun-woong.
 Ahn Chang-hwan as Lee Jeong-hwan
An investigator with 8 years of experience who is appointed to Myung-joo's office.
 Ahn Eun-jin as Seong Mi-ran
An assistant with 3 years of experience. She is very quiet and only speaks when necessary.
 Jung Jae-sung as Kim In-joo
A prosecutor with 24 years of experience. He is the head of the branch.
 Kim Yong-hee as Chief Nam
A prosecutor with 18 years of experience who entered the prosecution the same year as Min-ho.
 Shin Cheol-jin as Ryu-jin	
 Park Sung-yeon as Kang Young-hee
 Cha Soon-bae as Choi Tae-joong, a lawyer.
 Kwak Ja-young as Lee Soon-chul, a shaman.
 Son Kyung-won as Kim Young-chun, an industrial worker.

Production

Screenwriter Park Yeon-seon, who created the series, and director Lee Tae-gon previously worked together on the television series Hello, My Twenties! (2016) and its sequel Hello, My Twenties! 2'' (2017).

The first script reading took place in July 2019 at JTBC Building in Sangam-dong, Seoul, South Korea.

Filming and promotion
Filming began on August 24, 2019, and wrapped up on January 22, 2020. Scenes taking place in the fictional city of Jinyoung were filmed in Tongyeong, in South Gyeongsang Province, where more than 150 members of the cast and crew resided during the five months of filming.

The series showcase took place at Imperial Palace Seoul on December 16, 2019, a few hours before the premiere, in presence of the six main actors.

Original soundtrack

Part 1

Part 2

Part 3

Viewership

References

External links
  
 
 

Korean-language television shows
JTBC television dramas
2019 South Korean television series debuts
2020 South Korean television series endings
South Korean legal television series
Television shows based on South Korean novels
Television series about prosecutors